Iosif Davidovich Amusin (French: Joseph Amoussine, November 29, 1910, Vitebsk – June 12, 1984, Leningrad) was a Soviet historian, orientalist, hebraist and papyrologyst, was specialist in the history of the Ancient Near East and Qumran studies.

History 
Amusin was twice (in 1928 and 1938) arrested and sentenced for Zionist connections and "anti-Soviet" activity (acquitted posthumously in 1989). Graduated from the Historical Faculty of Leningrad University (1935–1941). Served as a medical officer during the Second World War.

After 1945, Amusin taught ancient history at the Leningrad Pedagogical Institute and Leningrad University until the anti-Semitic campaign against the so-called "cosmopolitanism," when he lost his job and, after a long period of unemployment, began lecturing at the Ulyanovsk Pedagogical Institute (1950–1954).

From the late 1950s, he published about 100 works on the Qumran and Dead Sea Scrolls.

1910 births
1984 deaths
Writers from Vitebsk
Belarusian Jews
Soviet historians
Russian classical scholars
Russian Hebraists
Jewish historians
20th-century Russian historians
Academic staff of Herzen University